The Tesla Rally is a FIA Alternative Energies Cup event named after the scientist Nikola Tesla. Reserved to vehicles with alternative energy propulsion, it starts and finishes in Belgrade.

Winners

References

FIA E-Rally Regularity Cup
Motorsport in Serbia